São Cristóvão is Portuguese for Saint Christopher. It may also refer to:

Places in Brazil
 São Cristóvão, Sergipe
 São Cristóvão do Sul, Santa Catarina
 Imperial de São Cristóvão, Rio de Janeiro

Other
 Paço de São Cristóvão, former imperial palace in Rio de Janeiro
 São Cristóvão de Futebol e Regatas, football club in Rio de Janeiro